Cameraria chambersella is a moth of the family Gracillariidae. It is known from Illinois and Texas in the United States.

The larvae feed on Quercus species. They mine the leaves of their host plant.

References

Cameraria (moth)

Moths of North America
Lepidoptera of the United States
Moths described in 1889
Leaf miners
Taxa named by Thomas de Grey, 6th Baron Walsingham